This article contains information about the literary events and publications of 1642.

Events
May – The 35-year-old John Milton marries the teenage Mary Powell. A few weeks later she leaves him in London and returns to her family in Oxfordshire.
May/June – English Cavalier poet Richard Lovelace is incarcerated in the Gatehouse Prison, Westminster for defying Parliament. During his time there he may be writing "To Althea, from Prison".
September 2 – The theatres in London are closed by the Puritan government; the "lascivious mirth and levity" of stage plays are to "cease and be forborn" for the next 18 years, during the English Civil War and the Interregnum. Richard Brome's A Jovial Crew is reportedly staged on the final day, making it the last to be performed in the era of English Renaissance theatre.

New books

Prose
Thomas Browne – Religio Medici
Gauthier de Costes, seigneur de la Calprenède – Cassandre
Thomas Fuller – The Holy State and the Profane State
Pieter Corneliszoon Hooft – Nederduytsche Historiën (History of the Netherlands, publication begins)
Sir Walter Ralegh – The Prince, or Maxims of State
Alonso de Castillo Solórzano – La garduña de Sevilla y anzuelo de las bolsas
Tohfatu'l-Ahbab, a Persian-language work by Muhammad Ali Kashmiri

Drama
Antonio Coello – Los empeños de seis horas (approximate date)
Pierre Corneille – Polyeucte
François le Métel de Boisrobert – La Belle Palène
Donaires del gusto
Pierre du Ryer – Saul
Francis Jaques – The Queen of Corsica
James Shirley – The Sisters
Jan Vos – Klucht van Oene (The Farce of Oene)

Poetry
John Denham – Cooper's Hill, the first example in English of a poem devoted to local description, in this case the Thames scenery around the author's home at Egham in Surrey
Richard Lovelace – "To Althea, from Prison"
Alonso de Castillo Solórzano – Academias morales de las musas

Births
March 15 (baptised) – Laurence Hyde, 1st Earl of Rochester, English politician and writer (died 1711)
April 21 – Simon de la Loubère, French diplomat, writer, mathematician and poet (died 1729)
April 30 – Christian Weise, German dramatist and poet (died 1708)
December 30 – Vincenzo da Filicaja, Florentine poet (died 1707)
Unknown dates
Abdul-Qādir Bīdel, Persian Sufi poet (died 1720)
Josep Romaguera, Catalan author (died 1723)
Ihara Saikaku (井原 西鶴), Japanese poet and creator of the ukiyozōshi (floating world) genre of prose (died 1693)
James Tyrrell, English political philosopher (died 1718)
Probable year of birth
Thomas Shadwell, English dramatist (died 1698)
Edward Taylor, English-born colonial American poet and author (died 1729)

Deaths
May 14 – Nicolas Ysambert, French theologian (born c. 1565)
June 1 – Sir John Suckling, English poet (born 1609)
July 5 – Festus Hommius, Dutch Calvinist theologian (born 1576)
Unknown dates
Abdul-Haqq Dehlavi, Indian Islamic scholar and writer (born 1551)
Sir Francis Kynaston, English poet (born 1587)
James Mabbe, English scholar, poet and translator (born 1572)

References

 
Years of the 17th century in literature